Besnik Zukaj (born 25 June 1978) is a Serbian football player of Albanian origin. He plays for SC Schöftland.

External links
 

1978 births
Living people
Serbian footballers
Albanians in Serbia
Association football goalkeepers
FC Luzern players